The Court of Justice of the State of Sergipe, headquartered in Brazil, and jurisdiction throughout the territory of the state, is the highest organ of the Judiciary and consists of thirteen (13) Judges appointed as the Constitution and the laws, holders of four different judging bodies: Full Court, Council of Magistrates, Civil Court and Criminal Chamber.

In the composition of the Court of Justice, a fifth of the seats are filled by lawyers in effective exercise of the profession and Prosecutors, all of notorious merit and moral suitability.

The Court is presided over by one of its members, elected for two (02) years and two (02) other Judges elected on the same occasion, and for the same period, exercise the functions of Vice-President and Corregidor General Justice prohibited re-election to the same office.

The Court President is replaced by the Vice-President, and this and the Corregidor by other Members, in descending order of seniority.

It consists of two chambers: one Civil, eight (08) Judges were divided into two groups; and a Criminal, composed of three Judges.

The President and the General Corregidor are not part of the Chambers.

The judgment of each participating Chamber only three of its Members. Each Chamber functions as distinct from the other Court, being the Full Court of the trial made that by law outside the competence of the Chambers.

The President of the Court presiding over the full Court and the Judicial Council; Vice President, Civil Chambers gathered; Isolated the Civil Chambers and the Criminal Chamber are presided over by its oldest member.

Composition 
 Des. Luiz Antônio Araújo Mendonça
 Des. José dos Anjos
 Des. Ricardo Múcio Santana de Abreu Lima
 Des. Roberto Eugenio da Fonseca Porto
 Des. Cezário Siqueira Neto
 Des. Osório de Araújo Ramos Filho
 Des. Edson Ulisses de Melo
 Des. Ruy Pinheiro da Silva
 Desa. Iolanda Santos Guimarães
 Des. Alberto Romeu Gouveia Leite
 Desa. Elvira Maria de Almeida Silva
 Des. Diógenes Barreto

References

Judiciary of Brazil
Sergipe
Subnational supreme courts